Denis Pankratov (born 4 July 1974) is a retired Russian butterfly swimmer of the 1990s, who was best known for winning the butterfly double at the 1996 Summer Olympics in Atlanta, United States in a unique style. His 100 m butterfly triumph is particularly remembered for his swimming over 25 m of the first lap underwater and then 15 m in the opposite direction, also underwater. He trained at the Volgograd club with fellow individual gold medallist at Swimming World World Swimmer of the Year Yevgeny Sadovyi.

Biography
Pankratov was born in Volgograd, Soviet Union.

At the age of 16, in 1990 and again in 1991, he won the Junior European Championships in the butterfly. In his first international appearance at senior level, he placed 6th in the final of the 200 m butterfly at the 1992 Summer Olympics in Barcelona. In 1993, at the European Championships in Sheffield, Pankratov won his first international medals, with gold medals in the 200 m butterfly and 4×100 m medley relay and a silver medal in the 100 m butterfly. He repeated this performance in the 1995 European Championships in Vienna, this time winning all three gold medals and breaking Pablo Morales's nine-year-old 100 m butterfly world record with a time of 52.32. He held the 100 m butterfly world record for over two years, until it was broken by Michael Klim.

At the 1994 World Championships in Rome, Pankratov swam head-to-head with all the best swimmers of the world. He won the 200 m butterfly, placed second in the 4×100 m medley relay and third in the 100 m butterfly. This competition established Pankratov as the leading butterflier in the world and two years later in Atlanta, at the 1996 Summer Olympics, he won two gold medals, one each in the 100 m and 200 m butterfly and a silver medal in the 4×100 m medley with his Russian teammates. His 100 m butterfly victory was another world record of 52.27 s, breaking his own record set the previous year. Uniquely, he won the 100 m butterfly by swimming more than 25 m of the first lap underwater and then 15 m in the opposite direction, also underwater. His submarine technique caused a rule change to restrict butterfly swimmers to 15 m underwater (humans swim slower than the speed which they gain from diving and gliding and bouncing off the walls), in line with the other strokes.

Pankratov attempted to repeat his success at the 2000 Summer Olympics in Sydney and finished 7th in the 200 m butterfly. He retired in 2002. In total, he set seven world records, three long course and four short course. His two long course 100 m butterfly world records stood for two years until broken in 1997, and his 200 m butterfly world record of 1:55.22 lasted five years before broken by Tom Malchow of the United States. His short course world records included two in the 100 m butterfly and one each in the 50 m and 200 m butterfly, set in 1997. He was named as the male World Swimmer of the Year by Swimming World magazine in 1995 and 1996.

See also
 List of members of the International Swimming Hall of Fame

References

External links

1974 births
Living people
Sportspeople from Volgograd
Russian male swimmers
Olympic swimmers of Russia
Olympic swimmers of the Unified Team
Male butterfly swimmers
Olympic gold medalists for Russia
Olympic silver medalists for Russia
Swimmers at the 1992 Summer Olympics
Swimmers at the 1996 Summer Olympics
Swimmers at the 2000 Summer Olympics
World record setters in swimming
Russian male freestyle swimmers
World Aquatics Championships medalists in swimming
Medalists at the FINA World Swimming Championships (25 m)
European Aquatics Championships medalists in swimming
Medalists at the 1996 Summer Olympics
Olympic gold medalists in swimming
Olympic silver medalists in swimming
Goodwill Games medalists in swimming
Competitors at the 1998 Goodwill Games